Joseph or Joe Fox may refer to:

 Joseph Fox the younger (1758–1838), British medical doctor
 Joseph Fox (Pennsylvania politician), speaker of the Pennsylvania Provincial Assembly, 1764–66
 Joseph Fox (dental surgeon) (1775–1816), British pioneer of dental education
 Joseph John Fox (1855–1915), Roman Catholic bishop
 Joe Fox (boxer) (1894–1965), British boxer
 Joe Fox (footballer) (1879–1948), Australian rules footballer
 Joe Fox (politician) (1931–1981), Irish politician
 Joseph Francis Fox (1853–1903), Member of Parliament for Tullamore